Dorothy Tree (born Dorothy Estelle Triebitz, May 21, 1906 – February 13, 1992) was an American actress, voice teacher and writer. She appeared in a wide range of character roles in at least 49 films between 1927 and 1951.

Her roles included Martha, mother of Knute Rockne in Knute Rockne, All American, and May Emmerich, the invalid wife of Louis Calhern in The Asphalt Jungle. After being blacklisted as a communist because of the House Un-American Activities Committee (HUAC) hearings, she began a second career as a voice teacher in New York. Emphasizing good diction and clarity, and the subtleties of intonation, she published four books on the subject.

Early life and stage career
She was born in Brooklyn, New York, the eldest of three daughters of Herman Triebitz (1877–1943) and Bertha Hert (1885–1967). Her sisters were Sylvia Triebitz (1911–1949) and Mildred "Mimi" Triebitz (1918–?) Her parents were born in Austria, and immigrated to the United States. Their native language was Yiddish. He was the proprietor of a shoe store in Brooklyn, and later sold shoes wholesale.

Tree attended Cornell University, leaving after two years to pursue a career. Taking the stage name Dorothy Tree, she began her acting career on the stage in 1926. Tree's Broadway credits include Bright Honor (1936), Clear All Wires (1932), The Merchant of Venice (1930), Holiday (1928), The Marquise (1927), and The Triumphant Bachelor (1927).

Film career
Tree made her motion picture debut (uncredited) playing a department store employee in the Famous Players-Lasky/Paramount Pictures silent era romantic comedy It (1927) starring Clara Bow and Antonio Moreno. Tree next played a wife of Bela Lugosi's Dracula (1931); she also played a bride of Dracula in the Spanish language version of the same title, which was shot at night with a different cast using the same sets at Universal.

Tree attracted attention as a feminine menace on the screen as the hairdresser-spy, Hilda Kleinhauer, in the Warner Bros. drama Confessions of a Nazi Spy (1939) starring Edward G. Robinson, which won the National Board of Review Award for Best Film – English Language. Her performance immediately won her the role as Reni Vonich, head of a spy ring attempting to steal the latest in technology, in Paramount's sci-fi drama Television Spy (1939). She was signed by RKO to portray the important role as Elizabeth Edwards, Mary Todd's sister, in Abe Lincoln in Illinois (1940) starring Raymond Massey.

She portrayed Martha Rockne in the Warners biopic Knute Rockne, All American, the mother of the famous football coach played by Pat O'Brien. In MGM's film noir crime/drama The Asphalt Jungle Tree played May Emmerich, a bedridden woman who is the very ingenuous and frustrated wife of Alonzo Emmerich (played by Louis Calhern), a crooked lawyer and double-crosser who, although he truly loves May, is having an adulterous affair with the character played by Marilyn Monroe.

Tree also appeared as Aunt Martha Dale in a teleplay of the live television anthology series The Silver Theatre (1950), which was titled Minor Incident. Her last role on the theater screen was as Marie Elsner in Columbia's crime/drama The Family Secret (1951) starring John Derek and Lee J. Cobb.

Blacklist and new career
In 1952, Tree and her husband, Michael Uris, were branded as communists and blacklisted due to the HUAC testimony of playwright/screenwriter Bernard C. Schoenfeld. That same year, she endorsed Adlai Stevenson in the 1952 presidential election.

She then began a second career teaching voice and diction in New York. She specialized in singing in English at the Metropolitan Opera and the Mannes College of Music, and also taught at the Manhattan School of Music, using her married name, Dorothy Uris. She was quoted as saying, "I left Dorothy Tree in Hollywood."

On November 4, 1956, an article written by Uris about English singing with good diction and its aiding a singer to clarify words for the listener was published in the New York Times. She published four books, Everybody's Book of Better Speaking (1960); To Sing in English, a Guide to Improved Diction (1971); A Woman's Voice: A Handbook to Successful Private and Public Speaking (1975); and Say it Again: Dorothy Uris' Personal Collection of Quotes, Comment & Anecdotes (1979).

Dorothy Tree Uris died at age 85 of heart failure at the Actors Fund of America Nursing Home in Englewood, New Jersey.

Personal life 
She married on June 8, 1928, in Manhattan, New York, screenwriter and story editor Michael Uris (March 25, 1902 – July 17, 1967). They had one son, Joseph M. Uris (born October 25, 1943).

Filmography

References

External links

1906 births
1992 deaths
American film actresses
American stage actresses
Actresses from New York (state)
Hollywood blacklist
Jewish American actresses
People from Brooklyn
Actresses from Los Angeles
People from Englewood, New Jersey
20th-century American actresses
Cornell University alumni
RKO Pictures contract players
New Jersey Democrats
New York (state) Democrats
California Democrats
20th-century American Jews